The Central del Movimiento de Trabajadores Costarricenses (CMTC) is a Costa Rican trade union center.

Originally created as the Federation of Christian Workers and Peasants of Costa Rica in 1967, it became the Central de Trabajadores Costarricenses in 1972, and the CMTC in the 1990s.

The Central of the Movement of Costa Rica Workers, "CMTC", is a response to real needs felt by the country's working class for a new alternative organization. A genuine, responsive organization and channel that shares promotion, consolidation, defense and for the struggle for the aspirations and interests of the working class and in general for all social and popular sectors.

The composition of the CMTC, maintains consistency with the conceptual framework of the Workers Movement, as developted by the Central Latinoamericana de Trabajadores - CLAT - which gives space to the labor unions to expand their necessary and severe work to do this together in a movement with other sectors such as autonomous economy, peasants, indigenous, migrants, disabled, pensioners, corporate, people, women, youth, childhood and adolescence and all forms organized to struggle for Social Justice, Welfare Integral and Dignity of the working class.

The CMTC is responsible for carrying out the integral, personal a collective promotion as Costa Rican workers, convinced that full release only occur with radical change of global economic, social, cultural and political structures in our country in which our working class must have a fundamental and protagonist role.

The CMTC is respectful for philosophical, political and religious beliefs of all its members and determines its own Declaration of Principles, Policy, Strategy and Platform of Struggle for realization of its objectives, with full independence from political parties; governments in power; political, economic and social centers; employers and religious or philosophical authorities.

It is affiliated with the International Trade Union Confederation.

See also

 Trade unions in Costa Rica

References

External links
Official Site C.M.T.C

Trade unions in Costa Rica
International Trade Union Confederation
Trade unions established in 1964